Sarab-e Dehlor (also Romanized as Sarāb-e Dehlor) is a village in Khezel-e Gharbi Rural District, in the Central District of Kangavar County, Kermanshah Province, Iran. At the 2006 census, its population was 256, in 59 families.

References 

Populated places in Kangavar County